Rebecca Katherine Priestley  is a New Zealand academic, science historian, and writer. She is Professor in Science in Society at Victoria University of Wellington.

Education
Priestley earned a BSc in geology at Victoria University of Wellington (VUW) in 1990, a Bsc (Hons), First Class, in physical geography at VUW in 1992, and a PhD in history and philosophy of science from the University of Canterbury in 2010 with a thesis titled Nuclear New Zealand: New Zealand's nuclear and radiation history to 1987.

Academic career 
Priestley is a Professor in Science in Society at Victoria University of Wellington, where she teaches undergraduate courses in science communication and creative science writing, and leads a Master of Science in Society programme.

The three areas of Priestley's research are: 20th-century history of science, with a focus on science in New Zealand and Antarctica; science communication and public engagement with science; and creative science writing practice. Priestley took a sabbatical to do a Master of Arts in creative writing at the International Institute of Modern Letters (IIML), in the nonfiction stream, writing a book about Antarctica.

Priestley co-founded the Centre for Science in Society at Victoria University which focuses on the relationship between science, scientists, society, the history of science, and the communication of scientific ideas and issues to different audiences using the vast range of media sources available today.

She was the 2016 winner of the Prime Minister's Science Communicator's Prize. In June 2017, Priestley co-founded the Aotearoa New Zealand Science Journalism Fund, which offers funding for projects reporting on science-related issues of importance to New Zealanders.

In July 2018, Priestley was elected as a Companion of the Royal Society Te Apārangi.

Selected works 
 Dispatches from Continent Seven: an anthology of Antarctic science, Priestley, R. (Ed.). (2016), Wellington, New Zealand: Awa Press.
 The Fukushima Effect in New Zealand: a historical perspective from a 'nuclear-free' country, Priestley, R. (2016). In Hindmarsh, R., & Priestley, R. (Eds.), The Fukushima Effect: a new geopolitical terrain. New York, USA, London, UK: Routledge.
 Mad on Radium: New Zealand in the Atomic Age, Priestley, R. (2012). Auckland, New Zealand: Auckland University Press.
 The Awa Book of New Zealand Science,  Priestley, R. (Ed.). (2008), Wellington, New Zealand: Awa Press.
 Atoms, dinosaurs & DNA: 68 great New Zealand scientists, Meduna, V., & Priestley, R. (2008), Auckland, New Zealand: Random House.

Awards 
 2009 Winner, Royal Society of New Zealand Science Book Prize
 2016 Winner, Prime Minister’s Science Communicator’s Prize
 2009 Award, Storylines Children’s Literature Charitable Trust notable books
 2009 Winner, LIANZA Elsie Locke Non-Fiction Award

References

External links 
 
 Academic profile at Victoria University of Wellington
 

Living people
Academic staff of the Victoria University of Wellington
University of Canterbury alumni
International Institute of Modern Letters alumni
21st-century New Zealand historians
New Zealand women historians
Year of birth missing (living people)
Companions of the Royal Society of New Zealand